The , or officially Todoroki Athletics Stadium, is a multi-purpose stadium located in Todoroki Ryokuchi in Kawasaki, Kanagawa Prefecture, Japan. It is currently used mostly for football matches and is the home stadium of Kawasaki Frontale.  Until the early 2000s it also hosted major clubs in the city, such as Verdy Kawasaki (Tokyo Verdy), Toshiba (Consadole Sapporo) and NKK S.C. The stadium has also played host to multiple IAAF competitions, most recently in 2017, and will play host to the British Olympic Association's Pre-Games Training Camp in the lead up to the 2020 Tokyo Olympic and Paralympic Games.

The stadium holds 26,232 people and was built in 1962. The stadium hosted the 2007 IFAF World Championship Opening Match and Final. The closest train station is Musashi-Nakahara on the Nambu line. There are bus routes to this station and special services on game days.

References

External links 

J. League stadium guide 

Football venues in Japan
American football venues in Japan
Athletics (track and field) venues in Japan
Sports venues in Kawasaki, Kanagawa
Kawasaki Frontale
Multi-purpose stadiums in Japan
Sports venues completed in 1962
1962 establishments in Japan